Choirul Huda (2 June 1979 – 15 October 2017) was an Indonesian professional footballer and civil servant.

Personal life
Huda began his career in Persela Lamongan since 1999 and stayed with the club until his death in 2017. A legend of the club, he was dubbed "One Man, One Club, One Love" by Persela supporters.

According to Indonesian football writer Antony Sutton, "he played for his local team, he was living the dream. He was just happy in his skin and happy in his town. He's a legend – a one-club man, His ambition was to become his club's goalkeeping coach after he retired. He never created a fuss about anything. He loved what he was doing but did it in such an understated way."

He was married and had two children.

International career 
Huda was given his first call-up for the Indonesian national team in a 2015 AFC Asian Cup qualification match, a 1-1 draw against China PR on 15 October 2013.
Huda was called up another six times but didn't play.

Death
Huda died after an incident in a match against Semen Padang at the 2017 Liga 1. He collided with teammate Ramon Rodrigues while trying to collect the ball from an opponent and was struck in the chest. Paramedics immediately gave him sideline emergency treatment. A paramedic said that after the incident, he was still conscious and complained of a chest pain, but his condition soon relapsed and he later died from his injuries in a local hospital.

According to a doctor in the local hospital, he suffered a collision on his chest and lower jaw, which caused hypoxia that ultimately led to his death. Moreover, due to severe injuries, he might have also experienced trauma to his head, neck and chest.

Honours

Source:

 Liga Indonesia Second Division: 2001
 East Java Governor's Cup (5): 2003, 2007, 2009, 2010, 2012

See also 
 List of one-club men

References

External links

1979 births
2017 deaths
Association football players who died while playing
Javanese people
People from Lamongan Regency
Association football goalkeepers
Indonesian footballers
Liga 1 (Indonesia) players
Persela Lamongan players
Indonesian Premier Division players
Filmed deaths in sports
Sport deaths in Indonesia
Sportspeople from East Java